Aggregates Levy is a tax levied on the commercial exploitation of rock, sand, and gravel in the United Kingdom.

History 
The Aggregates Levy was introduced in 2002. Revenues were initially placed into the Aggregates Levy Sustainability Fund until March 2011, when the fund was scrapped. The tax is intended to promote the use of recycled aggregate.

Receipts 
From 1 April 2002 to 31 May 2008, it was levied at £1.60 per tonne, and from 1 April 2008 to 30 May 2009, at £1.95 per tonne.

References 

Taxation in the United Kingdom
Environmental tax